Judith Livingston (born 1955) is an American lawyer.

Livingston grew up on Long Island, and initially intended to study sociology. However, she gained a J.D. degree from Hofstra University and instead went into the legal profession.

In 1992 Livingston became the first female member to be admitted to the exclusive Inner Circle of Advocates, a society of top American lawyers. In 2022, she became president of this invitation-only organization of the top 100 plaintiffs lawyers in the United States.

A specialist in medical malpractice, Livingston is a partner at the New York legal firm Kramer, Dillof, Livingston and Moore, and is married to her fellow partner Thomas Moore.

References

1955 births
Living people
American lawyers
People from Long Island
Maurice A. Deane School of Law alumni